The 1926 Howard Bulldogs football team was an American football team that represented Howard College (now known as the Samford University) as a member of the Southern Intercollegiate Athletic Association (SIAA) during the 1926 college football season. In their third year under head coach Jenks Gillem, the team compiled a 4–4–1 record.

Schedule

References

Howard
Samford Bulldogs football seasons
Howard Bulldogs football